Rhun may refer to:

People
 Rhun (Welsh given name)
 Beli ap Rhun (517–599), King of Gwynedd
 Rhun ab Arthgal King of Strathclyde c. 870
 Rhun ab Owain Gwynedd (died 1146), son of King Owain Gwynedd
 Rhun Hir ap Maelgwn (died 586), King of Gwynedd
 Rhun ap Iorwerth (born 1972), Welsh politician and journalist
 Rhun Williams (born 1997), Welsh rugby union player

Other uses
 Run (island) or Rhun, one of the Banda Islands, Indonesia
 Rhûn, a fictional region of Middle-earth created by J. R. R. Tolkien
 Prince Rhun, a fictional character in The Chronicles of Prydain

See also
 Caerhun (Rhun's Fort), a former civil parish in Conwy, Wales
 Weston Rhyn, a large village and civil parish in Shropshire, England